Georg Carl Wiegand (1 August 1877 – 17 March 1917) was a German gymnast. He competed in the men's individual all-around event at the 1900 Summer Olympics. He was killed in action during World War I.

References

External links
 

1877 births
1917 deaths
German male artistic gymnasts
Olympic gymnasts of Germany
Gymnasts at the 1900 Summer Olympics
Gymnasts from Berlin
German military personnel killed in World War I